Phodong is a town 38 kilometers north of Gangtok, the capital of the Indian state of Sikkim in North Sikkim district. Phodong is famous for the "Phodong Monastery" and the "Labrang Monastery" which is situated at a slightly higher altitude than the Phodong Monastery. The main occupation is farming on terraced slopes, though in recent years, tourism has contributed to the economy.

Banking facilities in Phodong
State Bank of India is currently operating in one branch in Phodong town, North Sikkim District of Sikkim
State Bank Of India, Phodong

References 

Cities and towns in Mangan district